Abdul Fazil Sattaur (born April 6, 1965) is a Canadian cricketer in the position of wicketkeeper. Born in British Guiana, he played three One Day Internationals for Canada. He is sometimes referred to as Fazil Sattaur or Fazil Samad.

External links
 

Sattuar, Abdul
Canada One Day International cricketers
Canadian cricketers
Berbice cricketers
Living people
Guyanese emigrants to Canada
Canadian sportspeople of Indian descent
Guyanese cricketers
Guyana cricketers